Walter Wallace may refer to:

Walter Wallace (died 2020), black man fatally shot by police in Philadelphia, U.S.
Walter Ian James Wallace, British civil servant
Walter Wallace, NASCAR driver in 1976 Music City USA 420
Walter Wallace, character in American medical drama television series Pure Genius

See also
Watty Wallace (1900–1964), Australian politician
Walter Wallace Singer (1911–1992), American football player
Wal Wallace or Pierre Carl Ouellet (born 1967), Canadian professional wrestler